Andrea Pisani may refer to:
Andrea Pisani (admiral) (1662–1718), Venetian admiral
Andrea Pisani (footballer) (born 1987), Italian footballer